Limernaea picta is a species of beetle in the family Cerambycidae, the only species in the genus Limernaea.

References

Xystrocerini